GIBS may refer to:
 General Inspection of Security Forces, Czech law enforcement which controls officers of armed forces
 The Gordon Institute of Business Science, University of Pretoria, a business school in Johannesburg, South Africa
 The Graz International Bilingual School
 Gib (video gaming), a term in first person shooter games for bits of a character left after a kill

See also
Jib
Gibbs (disambiguation)
Gib (disambiguation)